Snåsa Station is a railway station on the Nordland Line serving the village of Snåsa in Snåsa, Norway.  It opened in 1926 when the Nordland Line was completed up to this point from Trondheim.  The station has been unstaffed since 1984.

References

Railway stations in Trøndelag
Railway stations on the Nordland Line
Railway stations opened in 1926
1926 establishments in Norway
Snåsa